from Tohoku University, Sendai, Japan was named Fellow of the Institute of Electrical and Electronics Engineers (IEEE) in 2014 for contributions to plasmonic semiconductor integrated device technology for terahertz sensing.

References

Fellow Members of the IEEE
Living people
Year of birth missing (living people)
Place of birth missing (living people)